The Santa Cruz Formation is a geological formation in the Magallanes/Austral Basin in southern Patagonia in Argentina and in adjacent areas of Chile. It dates to the late Early Miocene epoch, and is contemporaneous with eponymous Santacrucian SALMA. The formation extends from the Andes to the Atlantic coast. In its coastal section it is divided into two members, the lower, fossil rich Estancia La Costa Member, which has a lithology predominantly consisting of tuffaceous deposits and fine grained sedimentary claystone and mudstone, and the upper fossil-poor Estancia La Angelina Member, which consists of sedimentary rock, primarily claystone, mudstone, and sandstone. The environment of deposition is interpreted to have been mostly fluvial, with the lowermost part of the Estancia La Costa Member being transitional between fluvial and marine conditions. The environment of the Estancia La Costa Member is thought to have been relatively warm and humid, but likely became somewhat cooler and drier towards the end of the sequence. The Santa Cruz Formation is known for its abundance of South American native ungulates (astrapotheres, litopterns, notoungulates), as well as an abundance of rodents, xenarthrans (armadillos, sloths, anteaters), and metatherians.

Stratigraphy 
The Santa Cruz Formation is exposed in isolated outcrops across the Magallanes/Austral Basin extending from the Atlantic coast to the Andes, especially along the Santa Cruz River, as well as along the southern coastline of Santa Cruz Province. While primarily located in Argentina, small outcrops are also present in adjacent areas of Chile. The base of the formation is defined by a marine regression event transitioning from the marine environment of the underlying Monte Léon Formation, during which time large large areas of Patagonia were submerged as a part of the Patagoniense Transgression. The main source of sediment input to the basin was from the Andean orogeny to the west. The formation reaches a maximum thickness at any one locality of over 295 metres, though the total thickness of the formation is strongly controlled by subsequent erosion and the 295 metres likely does not represent a complete sequence. The formation primarily consists of floodplain deposits. The lower parts of the formation have an abundance of tuffs and tuffaceous sediments. These likely originated from distant eruptions that were transported into the basin by aerial fallout, wind or river transport. The formation is suggested to span an approximately 3 million year interval in the late Early Miocene around 18 to 15.2 million years ago, during the Burdigalian and Langhian stages.

Paleoenvironment 
The environment of the Santa Cruz Formation is thought to have been relatively warm and humid, to have included a mix of open savannah, gallery forests and semi-deciduous forests. Permanent bodies of water such as lakes, ponds and streams are likely to have been present in some areas.

Paleoflora

Paleofauna

Invertebrates

Amphibians

Birds

Reptiles

Mammals

Meridiungulates

Astrapotheres

Litopterns

Notoungulates

Xenarthrans

Pilosa

Cingulata

Metatherians

Rodents

Primates

Meridiolestida

References

 
Geologic formations of Argentina
Geologic formations of Chile
Miocene Series of South America
Neogene Argentina
Neogene Chile
Friasian
 
Fossiliferous stratigraphic units of South America
Paleontology in Argentina
Sandstone formations
Mudstone formations
Tuff formations
Lacustrine deposits
Geology of Santa Cruz Province, Argentina
Austral or Magallanes Basin